Aksenovka or Aksyonovka is the name of several rural localities in Russia.

Modern localities
Aksenovka, Altai Krai, a settlement in Novorossiysky Selsoviet of Rubtsovsky District in Altai Krai; 
Aksenovka, Republic of Mordovia, a village in Lopatinsky Selsoviet of Torbeyevsky District in the Republic of Mordovia; 
Aksenovka, Omsk Oblast, a village in Sukhovskoy Rural Okrug of Gorkovsky District in Omsk Oblast
Aksenovka, Penza Oblast, a village in Yaganovsky Selsoviet of Vadinsky District in Penza Oblast
Aksenovka, Vladimir Oblast, a village in Alexandrovsky District of Vladimir Oblast

Alternative names
Aksenovka, alternative name of Aksenovo, a village in Voroninskoye Rural Settlement of Klinsky District in Moscow Oblast;

See also
Aksenov (rural locality)
Aksenovo